Van Burtenshaw is an American politician serving as a member of the Idaho Senate from the 35th district. He previously represented the same district in the Idaho House of Representatives.

Education 
He has an associate degree from Ricks College.

Career 
On November 4, 2014, Burtenshaw won the election unopposed and became a Republican member of the Idaho House of Representatives for District 35, seat A. On November 8, 2016, as an incumbent, Burtenshaw won the election unopposed and continued serving District 35, seat A.

On May 15, 2018, Burtenshaw won the Republican primary against Jud Miller 53.1% to 46.9%.
On November 6, 2018, he won the general election for Idaho Senate for District 35, he was unopposed.

Burtenshaw is anti-abortion and a gun rights supporter.

Personal life
Burtenshaw is married to his wife Joni and they have five children and 12 grandchildren. He is a farmer, rancher, and livestock dealer.

References

External links 
 Burtenshaw, Van at ourcampaigns.com

1950s births
Living people
Republican Party Idaho state senators
Year of birth missing (living people)
Republican Party members of the Idaho House of Representatives
Brigham Young University–Idaho alumni
21st-century American politicians